Boletus bicoloroides is a fungus of the genus Boletus native to the United States. It was first described officially in 1971 by mycologists Alexander H. Smith and Harry Delbert Thiers.

See also
 List of Boletus species

References

External links
 

bicoloroides
Fungi described in 1971
Fungi of the United States
Taxa named by Harry Delbert Thiers
Taxa named by Alexander H. Smith
Fungi without expected TNC conservation status